The New York City Drag March, or NYC Drag March, is an annual drag protest and visibility march taking place in June, the traditional LGBTQ pride month in New York City. Organized to coincide ahead of the NYC Pride March, both demonstrations commemorate the 1969 riots at the Stonewall Inn, widely considered the pivotal event sparking the gay liberation movement, and the modern fight for LGBT rights. 

The Drag March takes place on Friday night as a kick-off to NYC Pride weekend. The event starts in Tompkins Square Park and ends in front of the Stonewall Inn; it is purposefully non-corporate, punk, inclusive, and largely leaderless.

Background 
In 1994, while preparations for Stonewall 25 were taking place in New York City, it was made public that event organizers were not going to include leathermen or drag queens in the official ceremonies. Activist Gilbert Baker, creator of the Rainbow Flag, aka Sister Chanel 2001 with the drag activist troop Sisters of Perpetual Indulgence, recently moved to the city from San Francisco, and Brian Griffin, aka Harmonie Moore Must Die,  created the alternate event. Baker, who was busy creating a mile-long rainbow flag for the parade, the world’s largest until he made an even bigger one in 2003, came up with the idea, while Harmonie, working in Baker’s shop, had grassroots organizational skills from work with ACT UP and Women's Health Action and Mobilization (WHAM), to organize the drag march. Harmonie was also a member of Church Ladies for Choice, an activist drag troop that countered the anti-abortion group Operation Rescue. The Church Ladies were inspired by the San Francisco-based Sisters of Perpetual Indulgence, who didn’t yet have a New York house, to collect and parody church pamphlets advertising the march with the slogan “Jesus Loves Drag,” they passed out the materials in gay bars.

Starting location 
Participants were directed to Tompkins Square Park as the starting point, chosen to honor the rebellious spirit of two previous riots that had taken place. The Tompkins Square Park riot of 1988 where city officials attempted to remove squatters and punks who had been living in the park, and the Tompkins Square Park riot of 1874, over a hundred years prior where “thousands of unemployed New Yorkers demonstrated to demand that the government establish public works programs following the Panic of 1873 and the ensuing depression”.

First march 
The first drag march had an estimated 10,000 participants spread over ten blocks. The start was marked by The Church Ladies singing "God Is a Lesbian," another new tradition. During the march the participants chanted sometimes absurd organizing calls, and at one point the entire march sang “Love Is All Around”, the theme from The Mary Tyler Moore Show opening sequence, a tradition that has continued. Organizers painted a banner stating “It’s just a drag march, you may applaud,” and Stonewall 25 tourists joined in from across the nation. At the Stonewall Inn the entire march joined to sing “(Somewhere) Over the Rainbow,” originally performed by gay icon Judy Garland in the 1939 film The Wizard of Oz. Garland's death, and subsequent funeral held in New York City, occurred days before the Stonewall Riots.

1995 to present 
Harmonie continued to organize the event for the next few years before moving out of state, New York City Radical Faeries stepped in with Hucklefaery, a Radical Faerie and Sister of Perpetual Indulgence, becoming involved in 1998. The Faeries added rituals and centeredness. Hucklefaery stated, “we are unifying our intentions: to honor our ancestors; to celebrate those of us present at the March; and by being present, we are catalysts for a future yet unrealized.”

Baker died in March 2017, and that year’s march was dedicated to him.

The 25th Drag March took place June 28, 2019, coinciding with Stonewall 50 – WorldPride NYC, the largest international LGBTQ event in history. The following year the Drag March had a notably smaller scale due to the coronavirus pandemic. The protest march resumed its usual "loud music, lots of dancing, cheeky chants... and hundreds of amazing outfits" in 2021. The 2022 Drag March coincided with the news that Roe v. Wade had been overturned.

See also 
 LGBT culture in New York City
 NYC Pride March
 Queens Pride Parade
 Queer Liberation March

References

Notes

Sources 

 
 
 

1994 establishments in New York City
Annual events in New York City
Drag events
LGBT culture in New York City
Protest marches in New York City
Recurring events established in 1994